Yesyears is the first box set by English progressive rock band Yes, released in August 1991 on Atco Records. After the group left Atco for Arista Records when they became an eight-man formation in 1990, the deal gave Atco the right to the band's back catalogue, thus allowing them to release a career-spanning box set. Yesyears contains studio and live tracks from 1969 to 1991 with previously unreleased mixes and songs, digitally remastered by Joe Gastwirt.

One of the major attractions of Yesyears was its inclusion of rare material, including many previously unreleased songs, and a full-colour booklet detailing Yes's history. A condensed version of this package, entitled Yesstory, would be released in 1992 on two discs. Yesyears was discontinued in the late 1990s, preceding the release of Rhino Records' (five-disc) box set In a Word: Yes (1969–) in 2002.  Most of the rare material found on Yesyears but not on In a Word would surface on Rhino's reissues of Yes albums in 2003 and 2004.

Track listing 

Yesyears (Atco 791 644) failed to chart in the UK or United States

Personnel

Yes
Jon Anderson – lead vocals (1.1 – 1.13, 2.1 – 2.6, 3.1, 3.4 – 3.5, 3.8 – 3.12, 3.16, 4.3 – 4.10), harp (3.3, 3.7), guitar (3.6)
Peter Banks – guitar, backing vocals (1.1 – 1.8)
Bill Bruford – drums (1.1 – 1.13, 2.1 – 2.4)
Tony Kaye – keyboards (1.1 – 1.11, 4.1 – 4.11)
Chris Squire – bass, backing vocals (all); lead vocals (3.15, 4.2)
Steve Howe – guitar, backing vocals (1.9 – 1.13, 2.1 – 2.6, 3.1, 3.4 – 3.6, 3.8 – 3.14, 3.16)
Rick Wakeman – keyboards (1.12 – 1.13, 2.1 – 2.5, 3.3 – 3.12)
Alan White – drums (2.5 – 2.6, 3.1, 3.4 – 3.6, 3.8 – 3.16, 4.1 – 4.11)
Patrick Moraz – keyboards (2.6, 3.1, 3.16)
Geoff Downes – keyboards (3.13 – 3.14)
Trevor Horn – lead vocals (3.13 – 3.14)
Trevor Rabin – guitar (4.1 – 4.11), lead vocals (4.1, 4.11)

Additional musicians
David Foster – backing vocals (1.6), acoustic guitar (1.8)
Billy Sherwood – additional background vocals, acoustic guitar, keyboards (4.11)

References 

Albums with cover art by Roger Dean (artist)
Albums produced by Trevor Horn
Albums produced by Eddy Offord
Albums produced by Trevor Rabin
Yes (band) compilation albums
1991 compilation albums
Atlantic Records compilation albums